PS Barito Putera U-20 is active departments of youth Football club for PS Barito Putera. The club is currently competing in the Elite Pro Academy U-20.

<noinclude>

As of Barito Putera promotion to Indonesian Super League in 2013, this team properly competing in Indonesia Super League U-21 at the time.

Honours 

 Liga 1 U-19 format
 Third Place: 2018
 EPA format
 Runners-up: 2019

Players 
''The following players are eligible for Liga 1 U-20 in the current 2019 Liga 1 U-20 season.

Kit manufacturers

References 

PS Barito Putera